Bhor Sagar Port Limited (BSPL)  is a Public Sector Enterprise of India responsible for the management, maintenance and governance of the country's Proposed major Sagar port,  located in the island  of sagar on the mouth of Hooghly river  from the shore of the Bay of Bengal of the Indian Ocean. The BSPL is part of the Ministry of Shipping.

References

Government agencies of India